Thomas Freke may refer to:

 Thomas Freke (died 1633) (1563–1633), Member of Parliament for Dorchester and Dorset
 Thomas Freke (died 1701) (1638–1701), Member of Parliament for Dorset
 Thomas Freke (1660–1721), Member of Parliament for Cricklade, Weymouth and Melcombe Regis and Lyme Regis